Events in the year 1968 in Portugal.

Incumbents
President: Américo Tomás 
Prime Minister: António de Oliveira Salazar (until 27 September), Marcelo Caetano (from 27 September)

Arts and entertainment
Portugal participated in the Eurovision Song Contest 1968, with Carlos Mendes and the song "Verão".

Sport
In association football, for the first-tier league seasons, see 1967–68 Primeira Divisão and 1968–69 Primeira Divisão; for the Taça de Portugal seasons, see 1967–68 Taça de Portugal and 1968–69 Taça de Portugal. 
 16 June - Taça de Portugal Final

References

 
Portugal
Years of the 20th century in Portugal
Portugal